Campo Lameiro is a municipality in Galicia, Spain in the province of Pontevedra. Campo Lameiro is the Galician capital of rock art, with a large collection of petroglyphs located in the Archaeological Park of Campo Lameiro.

Location
The capital is A Lagoa, an entity belonging to the parish of Campo, which is 20 kilometers from the Pontevedra capital.

Parishes
The municipality is composed of 6 parishes comprising the following towns:
 Parish of O Campo (San Miguel): A Lagoa, Campo Lameiro, Chacente, Morañó, Praderei and Alende.
 Parish of O Couso (San Cristovo): Rozas, Castriño, Liñares, Fafide, Padín, Cimadevila and Castro de Orto.
 Parish of Fragas (Santa Mariña): Laxe, Reboredo, As Cruces, Cerdeiras, Fontenla, Mullerboa, Redonde and Gargallóns.
 Parish of Moimenta (Santa María): Moimenta, Lamosa, Painceiros, Paredes, Armonda and A Brea.
 Parish of Montes (San Isidro): Parada and Fornelos.

Festivals
 Festival of San Isidro Labrador (May 15)
 Festival of Aguardiente (June)
 Festival of San Antonio (June 13)
 Festival of San Miguel (September 29)

References

Municipalities in the Province of Pontevedra